Mineral is an American emo band originally from Houston, Texas. Soon after their formation, they relocated to Austin. All four members of Mineral were signed to Interscope Records on individual contracts. After disbanding in 1998, its members worked on other musical projects, including The Gloria Record, Pop Unknown, and Zookeeper.

In 2010, a compilation CD of all the band's songs (except for "Sadder Star") was released in Japan, entitled TheCompleteCollection.

Mineral announced a reunion tour on April 24, 2014. In 2019, the band celebrated their 25th anniversary with two new songs titled "Aurora" and "Your Body Is The World", a retrospective book, and by going on tour. On Saturday, September 25 the band performed a set at Furnace Fest 2021 in Birmingham, Alabama.

Musical style
Mineral have mainly been described as being an emo band but incorporate elements of indie rock, post-rock, and alternative rock. In a Reddit AMA, Chris Simpson and Jeremy Gomez cited Mineral's main influences as Catherine Wheel, Sugar, Swervedriver, Buffalo Tom, Dinosaur Jr., Superchunk and Rocket from the Crypt.

Members
Chris Simpson – vocals and guitar
Scott McCarver – guitar
Jeremy Gomez – bass
Gabriel Wiley – drums

Discography

Singles and EPs
 Gloria (7'',1994)
 February / M.D. (7'', 1996)
 Mineral/Jimmy Eat World/Sense Field (1997) — Split EP with Jimmy Eat World and Sense Field
 &Serenading / Love My Way (1998)
 One Day When We Are Young (2019)

Albums
 The Power of Failing (1997)
 EndSerenading (1998)

Compilations
 TheCompleteCollection (Double LP, 2010)
 1994–1998: The Complete Collection (2014)

Related projects
 The Gloria Record – Christopher Simpson, Jeremy Gomez
 Imbroco – Gabriel Wiley, Scott David McCarver
 Kissing Chaos – Gabriel Wiley
 Pop Unknown – Gabriel Wiley
 Pretty the Quick Black Eyes – Scott David McCarver
 Mountain Time (Previously known as Zookeeper) – Chris Simpson (and occasionally Jeremy Gomez)

References

American emo musical groups
Musical groups established in 1994
Musical groups disestablished in 1998
Musical groups reestablished in 2014
Musical groups reestablished in 2018
Musical groups from Austin, Texas
Musical groups from Houston
Caulfield Records artists
1994 establishments in Texas